Yang Jeong-soon (born 26 February 1947) is a Korean former professional tennis player.

Yang featured in 16 Federation Cup rubbers for South Korea during the 1970s, which included an upset win over America's Patti Hogan in 1973. Her best performance in a grand slam tournament was a second round appearance at the 1973 Australian Open, where she was eliminated by Evonne Goolagong. In 1978 she and Lee Duk-hee became the first Korean pair to win an Asian Games gold medal in women's doubles.

References

External links
 
 
 

1947 births
Living people
South Korean female tennis players
Tennis players at the 1966 Asian Games
Tennis players at the 1974 Asian Games
Tennis players at the 1978 Asian Games
Asian Games medalists in tennis
Asian Games gold medalists for South Korea
Asian Games silver medalists for South Korea
Asian Games bronze medalists for South Korea
Medalists at the 1966 Asian Games
Medalists at the 1974 Asian Games
Medalists at the 1978 Asian Games
20th-century South Korean women